Chipping Norton Recording Studios was a residential recording studio in Chipping Norton, Oxfordshire, England, which operated from 1971 until  October 1999.

The studios were created by Mike and Richard Vernon as the in-house studio for Mike Vernon's record company Blue Horizon Records, and operated out of the former British Schools building at 26-30 New Street, a Grade II listed building. Further properties were added in adjacent buildings and the studio eventually provided 15 bedrooms with on-site catering for visiting musicians.

The studios became a commercial enterprise, and songs recorded there included "Baker Street" by Gerry Rafferty, "In The Army Now" by Status Quo, "Too Shy" by Kajagoogoo, "I Should Have Known Better" by Jim Diamond, "Promise Me" by Beverley Craven, "I'm Gonna Be (500 Miles)" by the Proclaimers, "Perfect" by Fairground Attraction, "(I Just) Died in Your Arms" by Cutting Crew, "Eighteen With A Bullet" by Pete Wingfield, "Hocus Pocus" by Focus and "Bye, Bye, Baby (Baby Goodbye)" by the Bay City Rollers., also Duran Duran recorded most part of their debut album Duran Duran (1981) with Colin Thurston as producer, and Radiohead recorded their 1993 debut album, Pablo Honey, at Chipping Norton, including their debut single "Creep".

On 15 June 2017, BBC Music Day, broadcast throughout the UK, awarded the studio with a blue plaque for its part in the musical heritage of England.

See also
 List of British recording studios

References

 

Recording studios in England
Grade II listed buildings in Oxfordshire
Former recording studios
Chipping Norton